Tavazzano con Villavesco is a comune (municipality) in the Province of Lodi in the Italian region Lombardy, located about  southeast of Milan and about  northwest of Lodi.

Tavazzano con Villavesco borders the following municipalities: Mulazzano, Casalmaiocco, Lodi, Montanaso Lombardo, Sordio, San Zenone al Lambro and Lodi Vecchio. It is served by Tavazzano railway station.

References

Cities and towns in Lombardy